Stylocheilus is a genus of sea slugs, specifically sea hares, marine opisthobranch gastropod mollusks in the family Aplysiidae, the sea hares.

According to some authors this genus belongs in the family Dolabriferidae.

Species
Species in the genus Stylocheilus include:
 Stylocheilus polyomma (Mörch, 1863)
 Stylocheilus rickettsi (MacFarland, 1966)
 Stylocheilus striatus Quoy & Gaimard, 1832
 Distribution : Indo-Pacific; intertidal, occurs up to 30 m depth
 Length : 65 mm
 Color : brownish, with blue spots; lined species, with dark longitudinal lines (as stated by its name striatus) and small eyespots, providing excellent camouflage.
 Description : Feeds on blue-green algae; gives off a purple ink when disturbed.
 Taxon inquirendum
 Stylocheilus longicauda Quoy & Gaimard, 1824 - Blue-ring Sea Hare, Lemon Sea Hare (used to be called  Stylocheilus citrina)
 Distribution : circumtropical, Indo-West Pacific.
 Color : bright yellow or green with bluish eyespots, no lines.
 Description : This is one of the most specialized sea hares; elongate body with a long "tail" (as stated by its name longicauda), adapted for living on floating seaweed; feeds on Mermaid's Hair, blue-green algae of species Lynghya majuscula; at times, they are abundant, with several thousands crawling in the sand, traveling in chains ("snail trail") up to 10 m long
Species brought into synonymy
 Stylocheilus citrinus (Rang, 1828) is a synonym of Stylocheilus longicauda (Quoy & Gaimard, 1825)
 Stylocheilus lineolatus Gould, 1852: synonym of Stylocheilus longicauda (Quoy & Gaimard, 1825)
 Stylocheilus quercinus Gould, 1852

References

 Rolán E., 2005. Malacological Fauna From The Cape Verde Archipelago. Part 1, Polyplacophora and Gastropoda

External links 
 
 Image of the Blue-ring Sea Hare
 'Snail trail' of the Blue-ring Sea Hare
 Image of Stylocheilus striatus

Aplysiidae
Taxa named by Augustus Addison Gould